Bălcăuți (also Балківці) is a commune located in Suceava County, Romania. It is composed of three villages: Bălcăuți, Gropeni and Negostina.

At the 2011 census, 70.3% of inhabitants were Ukrainians and 29.6% Romanians. At the 2002 census, 74.4% were Eastern Orthodox, 6.9% stated they belonged to another religion, 6.3% were Seventh-day Adventist, 6.1% Greek-Catholic and 4.5% Christian Evangelical.

Negostina

The village of Negostina features an important community of Ukrainians in Romania, with folk festivals taking place there from time to time.

Negostina hosts a bust of Ukrainian national poet Taras Shevchenko, one of three in Romania. Every year, on March 9 and 10, Ukrainian and Romanian officials lay wreaths on the bust.

1930 census
According to the census conducted in 1930, the population of Negostina was 1,957 inhabitants. Most of the inhabitants were Ruthenians (51.3%), with a minority of Germans (1.94%), one of Jews (0.85%), one of Romanians (43.35%), one of Russians (1.96%) and one of Poles (0.6%). From a religious point of view, most of the inhabitants were Orthodox (95.8%), but there were also Greek Catholics (0.75%), Jews (0.85%) and Roman Catholics (2.3%). Other people declared to be Evangelicals \ Lutherans (4 people) and Adventists (4 people).

2002 census
According to the 2002 Romanian census, the village had a population of 1474. 1095 (74.3%) declared Ukrainian nationality, while 371 (25.2%) declared Romanian nationality and 5 (0.3%) Polish nationality. As far as language 1118 (75.8%) declared Ukrainian language, while 347 (23.5%) declared Romanian language and 5 (0.3%) Polish nationality.

In 2002 the national composition was:

The declared language was:

Gallery

References

External links
 

Communes in Suceava County
Localities in Southern Bukovina
Ukrainian communities in Romania